The Stânca–Costești Dam is a dam on the Prut River and a checkpoint between Moldova and Romania. The dam is located between Costești (Moldova) and Stânca (Romania).

History

The basic Romanian-Soviet agreement on its construction was ratified in 1972. Built between 1974 and 1978, the Stânca Costești Lake was a USSR-Romanian project. The lake is the reservoir for a hydro power station. The main goal of building this power station was to protect villages down the Prut river from annual floods. The 1970 floods in Romania were the worst in modern Romanian history in loss of life.

On 5 November 1978 the Stânca-Costești Hydroelectrical Plant on the Prut was inaugurated. Romania was represented by Ion Iliescu, the then-Minister of Electric Power Trandafir Cocîrlă, and Chairman Florin Iorgulescu of the Romanian National Council for Water Conservation, while Ivan Bodiul, Minister of Power and Electrification Peter Stepanovich Neporozhny, and Deputy Minister of Land Reclamation and Water Conservation Polat Zade represented the USSR.

References

External links

 Barajul Stânca–Costești
 Customs Service of the Republic of Moldova

Prut
Moldova–Romania border crossings
Dams in Romania
Dams in Moldova
Dams completed in 1978
Hydroelectric power stations in Romania
Hydroelectric power stations in Moldova
Hydroelectric power stations built in the Soviet Union
Bridges in Moldova
Bridges in Romania
Bridges completed in 1978
Bridges over the Prut
Romania–Soviet Union relations
Bridges built in the Soviet Union
Buildings and structures in Botoșani County